Amena Safi Afzali (born 1957 ) is a politician in Afghanistan, who became Minister of Work, Social Affairs, Martyred, and Disabled in January 2010 after receiving the confidence vote of the Afghan National Assembly. She had previously served as commissioner with the Independent Human Rights Commission until 2004. and as the Minister of the Ministry of Youth Affairs until it integrated with the Ministry of Information and Culture.

Life
Amena Safi Afzali was born in 1957 in Herat city, Afghanistan. She completed her higher education in faculty of science of Kabul University in 1978. She was the founder of Educational and Training Centers for women, and the first free school in Kabul in 1994. Publications such as 'Rahrawan Samia', 'Al-Momenat','Paiwand', and 'Mother' were established and released under her surveillance. She also served as commissioner with the Independent Human Rights Commission until 2004. She is a member of the Directorate of Cultural Foundation of Jamee.

See also
Cabinet of Ministers
Politics of Afghanistan
1000 PeaceWomen

References

External links

 https://web.archive.org/web/20131203004119/http://www.afghanistanembassy.no/article/70976/H-E-Amina-Afzali

1957 births
Living people
People from Herat
Date of birth missing (living people)
Kabul University alumni
Women government ministers of Afghanistan
21st-century Afghan women politicians
21st-century Afghan politicians